"Like Me" is a 2008 single by Girlicious.

Like Me may also refer to:

 Like Me (film), a 2017 American horror film
 Like Me (musical), a musical
 "Like Me" (Lil Durk song), 2015
 Like Me: Confessions of a Heartland Country Singer, a 2010 memoir by Chely Wright